Amolita roseola is a moth species in the family Erebidae. It is found in North America.

The MONA or Hodges number for Amolita roseola is 9821.

References

Further reading

 
 
 

Omopterini
Articles created by Qbugbot
Moths described in 1903